Rocket Girls 101 was a Chinese idol girl group formed by Tencent through the 2018 reality show Produce 101 China on Tencent Video. The project girl group consists of eleven-members that came from different companies: Meng Meiqi, Wu Xuanyi, Yang Chaoyue, Duan Aojuan, Yamy, Lai Meiyun, Zhang Zining, Sunnee, Li Ziting, Fu Jing and Xu Mengjie. They made their debut on 23 June 2018, with the single song "Rocket Girls".

As their time as a girl group was limited to only 2 years they disbanded on June 23, 2020 and returned to their respective agencies.

History

Pre-debut: Produce 101 

The members participated as trainees in the show Produce 101 before debuting as members of Rocket Girls 101 on 23 June. The group includes two Cosmic Girls members, Meng Meiqi and Wu Xuanyi, both from Yuehua. They placed 1st and 2nd respectively. Yang Chaoyue (Wenlan Culture) and Duan Aojuan (Long Wu Tian Culture) placed 3rd and 4th. Former The Rap of China contestant, Yamy (JC Universe Entertainment), placed 5th. Lai Meiyun (Qigu Culture), Zhang Zining (Mavericks Entertainment), Sunnee (K-L Entertainment), Li Ziting (Huaying Yixing), Fu Jing (Banana Entertainment) and Xu Mengjie (Zimei Tao Culture) placed 6th, 7th, 8th, 9th, 10th, and 11th respectively.

2018-2020: Debut, contract controversy, Collide, The Wind, and Meeting · Goodbye
On June 23, 2018, they released the song "Rocket Girls". They made their first official TV appearance on "Happy China Graduation Music Concert 2018", which aired on Hunan Television the day after their debut. On August 9, two days before the group's official single release and press conference, Yuehua Entertainment and Mavericks Entertainment released a joint announcement stating that they would be withdrawing members Meiqi, Xuanyi, and Zhining from the group. The announcement also stated that Yuehua decided to withdraw Meiqi and Xuanyi due to the inability to come to an agreement with the company managing Rocket Girls 101 regarding their concurrent promotion with the group and Cosmic Girls, and that Mavericks Entertainment withdrew Zining due to health issues. 

However, on August 17, Yuehua and Mavericks both announced that the members would be returning to the group after coming to an agreement with Tencent, and stated that Rocket Girls 101'''s promotion would take priority over all members' original groups, unless agreements are reached.

On August 18, they released their first EP, Collide (撞). On September 15, the group performed the halftime show at Super Penguin Ultimate Game.

On June 23, 2019, they released their first studio album, The Wind (立风), Shingu Ryohei  is the director of the music video. The group then was announced to perform at the NBA halftime show later in the same year.

In early 2020, they released a new single named "Be Happy" (要嗨森) to celebrate the Chinese New Year. 

On May 25, 2020, they released their second and final EP, Meeting·Goodbye'' (遇见•再见).

On June 23, 2020, their contracts expired and the group disbanded making the 11 members officially graduated from the group after the formation.

Members 
 Meng Meiqi (孟美岐)
 Wu Xuanyi (吴宣仪)
 Yang Chaoyue (杨超越)
 Duan Aojuan (段奥娟)
 Yamy (郭颖)
 Lai Meiyun (赖美云)
 Zhang Zining (张紫宁)
 Sunnee (杨芸晴)
 Li Ziting (李紫婷)
 Fu Jing (傅菁)
 Xu Mengjie (徐梦洁)

Discography

Studio albums

Extended plays

Singles

Promotional singles

Soundtrack appearances

Filmography

Reality Shows

Awards and nominations

Notes

References

External links 

 

Chinese girl groups
Mandopop musical groups
Chinese pop music groups
Chinese dance music groups
Mandarin-language singers
Korean-language singers of China
Produce 101
Produce 101 (Chinese TV series) contestants
Musical groups established in 2018
Musical groups disestablished in 2020
2018 establishments in China
2020 disestablishments in China